Richard C. Gill (c.1901-1958) was best known for an expedition to describe the preparation of curare, and bring back samples, in the 1930s. He also published a book describing his expedition.

He had studied medicine, but became a rubber salesman. Unemployment in the 1920s led him to move to the Ecuadorian Andes, where he developed an interest in ethnobotany. This interest was enhanced when he developed multiple sclerosis. Given his experiences in Ecuador, he set up an expedition to obtain and describe the preparation of curare.

The botanical specimens were sent to the New York Botanical Garden while the twenty-five pounds of crude curare were offered to Squibb for analysis.

References

External links

Plant collectors
Writers with disabilities
American botanical writers
Year of birth uncertain
1958 deaths
People with multiple sclerosis